New York City's 34th City Council district is one of 51 districts in the New York City Council. It has been represented by Democrat Jennifer Gutiérrez since 2022.

Geography
District 34 covers several majority-Hispanic neighborhoods straddling the border between Brooklyn and Queens, including parts of Bushwick, Williamsburg, and Ridgewood.

The district overlaps with Queens Community Board 5 and Brooklyn Community Boards 1 and 4, and with New York's 7th, 8th, and 12th congressional districts. It also overlaps with the 12th, 15th, 18th, and 26th districts of the New York State Senate, and with the 37th, 38th, 50th, 53rd, and 54th districts of the New York State Assembly.

The district is only one of two in the City Council to span two different boroughs, the other being the 8th district in Manhattan and the Bronx.

Recent election results

2021
In 2019, voters in New York City approved Ballot Question 1, which implemented ranked-choice voting in all local elections. Under the new system, voters have the option to rank up to five candidates for every local office. Voters whose first-choice candidates fare poorly will have their votes redistributed to other candidates in their ranking until one candidate surpasses the 50 percent threshold. If one candidate surpasses 50 percent in first-choice votes, then ranked-choice tabulations will not occur.

2017

2013

References

New York City Council districts